Teucrium argutum, commonly known as native germander, is a species of flowering plant in the family Lamiaceae, and is endemic to eastern Australia. It is a perennial herb often suckering, with hairy, broadly egg-shaped leaves with toothed or wavy edges, and pink-purple flowers.

Description
The leaves are hairy and have toothed or wavy edges. Flowering occurs from December to June.

Taxonomy
Teucrium argutum was first formally described in 1810 by Robert Brown in his Prodromus Florae Novae Hollandiae et Insulae Van Diemen. In 2018, Anthony Bean selected the specimens collected near the Hawkesbury River as the lectotype.

Distribution and habitat
Native germander grows in forest and woodland from near Lakeland on Cape York Peninsula in Queensland, south to near Sydney.

References

argutum
Lamiales of Australia
Flora of New South Wales
Flora of Queensland
Plants described in 1810
Taxa named by Robert Brown (botanist, born 1773)